HD 190056 is a class K1III (orange giant) star in the constellation Sagittarius. Its apparent magnitude is 4.99 and it is approximately 291 light years away based on parallax.

It is a suspected variable, and the primary has one companion, B, with magnitude 12.7 and separation 54.4".

References

Sagittarius (constellation)
K-type giants
Suspected variables
CD-32 15682
098842
7659
190056